Parodoceratidae is one of five families of the Tornoceratoidea superfamily, a member of the Goniatitida order, first proposed by Germaine petter in 1959. They are an extinct group of ammonoid, which are shelled cephalopods related to squids, belemnites, octopuses, and cuttlefish, and more distantly to the nautiloids.

References

 The Paleobiology Database accessed on 10/01/07

Goniatitida families
Tornoceratoidea
Devonian first appearances
Devonian extinctions